Pebbles is the debut album by American singer Pebbles, released in 1987 on MCA Records. The album spawned two US Hot 100 hits; "Girlfriend" (US #5) and "Mercedes Boy" (US #2), as well as the top 5 R&B hit "Take Your Time".

Track listing

Production
Executive producer – George L. Smith
Track 1 produced by L.A and Babyface.  Track 2 produced by Alex Brown and Paul Jackson Jr.  Tracks 3 and 5 produced by Alex Brown and Danny Sembello.  Track 4 produced by Danny Sembello and Charlie Wilson.  Tracks 6, 7, 9 and 10 produced by Charlie Wilson.  Track 8 produced by Andre Cymone.  All tracks co-produced by Pebbles.
Recorded and engineered by Hilary Bercovici, Bobby Brooks, Gerry Brown, Craig Burbidge, Jon Gass, Peter Kelsey, Taavi Mote, John Payne, David Rideau, Bud Rizzo, Danny Sembello, Rob Von Arx, Randy Waldman
Assistant engineers – Lenette Viegas, John Hedges, Jeff Lorenzen, John Payne, Bud Rizzo, Danny Sembello, Rob Von Arx
Mixing – Taavi Mote, Louil Silas, Jr.
Mastering – Steve Hall

Personnel
Drums – L.A. Reid
Percussion – Paulinho da Costa
Bass – Kayo, Cornelius Mims
Guitars – Bruce Gaitsch, Paul Jackson Jr., Fred Jenkins, Michael Sembello
Keyboards – André Cymone, Kevin Grady, Roman Johnson, Danny Sembello, Billy Young
Saxophone and flute – Gary Herbig
Backing vocals – Babyface, Alex Brown, Cherrelle, Lynn Davis, Carol Dennis, Siedah Garrett, Marlena Jeter, Yvette Marine, Katrina Perkins, L.A. Reid, Danny Sembello, Jackie Smiley, Jullia Waters, Jessica Williams, Charlie Wilson

Charts

Weekly charts

Year-end charts

Certifications

References

1987 debut albums
MCA Records albums
Pebbles (singer) albums
Albums produced by L.A. Reid
Albums produced by Babyface (musician)
Freestyle music albums